Gallicus may refer to:

 Johannes de Garlandia (music theorist) (fl. c. 1270-1320), French music theorist
 Johannes Gallicus (humanist) (c. 1415-1473), French humanist
 Gallicus, a Roman cognomina
 Mars gallicus, a 1635 pamphlet written by Cornelius Jansen